The Classics in Rhythm is an album by the Royal Philharmonic Orchestra, published in 1989 by Arista Records as part of the Hooked on Classics series.

This album was released as Hooked on Rhythm & Classics in the UK and as simply Rhythm & Classics in the Netherlands.

Track listing 

 Symphony No. 5 / Beethoven
 William Tell Overture / Rossini
 Canon / Pachelbel
 The Phantom Of The Opera / Andrew Lloyd Webber
 In The Hall Of The Mountain King / Grieg
 Flight Of The Bumble Bee / Rimsky-Korsakov
 Ode To Joy / Beethoven
 Arrival Of The Queen Of Sheba / Brandenburg Concerto No.3 / Handel, Bach
 Aranjuez Mon Amour (Instrumental) / Rodrigo
 Post Horn Gallop / Koenig
 Toccata And Fugue In D Minor / Bach
 Sabre Dance / Khachaturian

References 

1989 albums
Royal Philharmonic Orchestra albums
Arista Records albums
Hooked on Classics albums